Robert Desmettre (5 August 1901 – 6 March 1936) was a French water polo player who competed in the 1924 Summer Olympics. He was part of the French team which won the gold medal. He played all four matches and scored eight goals.

See also
 France men's Olympic water polo team records and statistics
 List of Olympic champions in men's water polo
 List of Olympic medalists in water polo (men)

References

External links
 

1901 births
1936 deaths
French male water polo players
Water polo players at the 1924 Summer Olympics
Olympic water polo players of France
Olympic gold medalists for France
Olympic medalists in water polo
Medalists at the 1924 Summer Olympics
Sportspeople from Nord (French department)